Aspergillus shendaweii is a species of fungus in the genus Aspergillus. It is from the Fumigati section. Several fungi from this section produce heat-resistant ascospores, and the isolates from this section are frequently obtained from locations where natural fires have previously occurred. The species was first described in 2014.

Growth and morphology
A. shendaweii has been cultivated on both Czapek yeast extract agar (CYA) plates and Malt Extract Agar Oxoid® (MEAOX) plates. The growth morphology of the colonies can be seen in the pictures below.

References 

shendaweii
Fungi described in 2014